William Rowe may refer to:

William Rowe (Lord Mayor of London) (died 1593), Lord Mayor of London
William Rowe (politician) (1819–1886), Member of Parliament in New Zealand
William Rowe (athlete) (1913–1938), American hammer thrower
William Rowe (cricketer) (1892–1972), Australian cricketer
William B. Rowe (1910–1955), American artist and art educator
William Carpenter Rowe (died 1860), Chief Justice of British Ceylon
William E. Rowe (1820–1888), American farmer and politician from Wisconsin
William H. Rowe (1860–1947), American farmer, businessman, and politician from Illinois
William Hutchinson Rowe (1882–1955), American historian and author
William Earl Rowe (1894–1984), politician in Ontario, Canada
William L. Rowe (1931–2015), American philosopher of religion
William N. Rowe (1867–1916), member of the Royal Irish Constabulary
William T. Rowe (born 1947) American historian of China
Bill Rowe (born 1942), broadcaster, lawyer and politician
Bill Rowe (sound engineer) (1931–1992), English sound engineer
William Rowe, Cornish farmer murdered by Russell Pascoe and Dennis Whitty in 1963

See also
William Rowe Lyall, dean of Canterbury
William Roe (disambiguation)
William Row (1563–1634), Scottish presbyterian divine
William Bickford Row (1786–1865), English-born Newfoundland merchant, lawyer and politician